Gopalkrishna Devadas Gandhi (born 22 April 1945) is a former administrator and diplomat who  served as the 22nd Governor of West Bengal serving from 2004 to 2009. He is the grandson of Mahatma Gandhi and C. Rajagopalachari (Rajaji). As a former IAS officer he served as Secretary to the President of India and as High Commissioner to South Africa and Sri Lanka, among other administrative and diplomatic posts. He was the United Progressive Alliance nominee for Vice President of India 2017 elections and lost with 244 votes against NDA candidate Venkaiah Naidu, who got 516 votes.

Early life and background

Gopalkrishna Devadas Gandhi was born on 22 April 1945 in Delhi, to Devdas and Lakshmi Gandhi. His father was a journalist. Gandhi graduated with a master's degree in English literature from St. Stephen's College of Delhi University.

Career
He joined IAS as an Officer in 1968 and served in Tamil Nadu state till 1985. Thereafter, he remained Secretary to Vice-President of India (1985–1987), Joint Secretary to President of India (1987–1992).

In 1992, after retiring voluntarily from the IAS, he became Minister (Culture) in High Commission of India, UK and Director of The Nehru Centre, London, UK. This was followed by various diplomatic and administrative positions for the rest of his career, including High Commissioner of India to South Africa and Lesotho (1996), Secretary to President of India (1997–2000), High Commissioner of India in Sri Lanka (2000), and Ambassador of India to Norway, and Iceland (2002).

On 14 December 2004, he was appointed Governor of West Bengal following the expiry of the term of office of incumbent Viren J. Shah. He was succeeded by Devanand Konwar (the serving governor of Tripura), who was given additional charge of West Bengal. For a few months in 2006 he also took on additional duties as the Governor of Bihar.

He was the Chairman of Kalakshetra Foundation, Chennai from December 2011 to May 2014. In 2015, he translated the Tamil classic, the Tirukkural, into English. He was the chairman of governing body of Indian Institute of Advanced Study, and president of its society on 5 March 2012 and served until May 2014.

Mr. Gandhi teaches at Ashoka University, where he is a Professor of History and Politics.

Controversies

While delivering the 15th D P Kohli Memorial Lecture for CBI on "Eclipse at Noon: Shadows Over India's Conscience" with nearly 3000 officers of the agency in the audience, Gandhi noted that "The CBI is seen as the government's hatchet, rather than honesty's ally. It is often called DDT — meaning not the dichloro diphenyl trichloroethane, the colourless, tasteless, odourless insecticide it should be, but the department of dirty tricks."

In 2015, he wrote a letter to the President of India, Pranab Mukherjee, to reconsider the rejection of the mercy plea of the 1993 Mumbai serial blast convict, Yakub Memon.

Personal life
His paternal grandfather was Mahatma Gandhi and maternal grandfather was C. Rajagopalachari (Rajaji). He is the son of Devadas Gandhi and Lakshmi Gandhi. Gopalkrishna Gandhi is the younger brother of Rajmohan Gandhi, Ramchandra Gandhi, and Smt. Tara Bhattacharjee (Gandhi). Gopalkrishna Gandhi and his wife Tara have two daughters.

Bibliography 
Hindi
 Saranam, translated as Refuge in English
 Dara Shukoh, a play in verse
 Koi Acchha Sa Larka (translation into Hindustani of Vikram Seth's A Suitable Boy)

English
 Gandhi and South Africa
 Gandhi and Sri Lanka
 Nehru and Sri Lanka
 India House, Colombo: Portrait of a Residence
 Gandhi Is Gone. Who Will Guide Us Now? (edited) 
 A Frank Friendship/ Gandhi and Bengal: A Descriptive Chronology (compiled and edited).
 Tiruvalluvar: The Tirukkural (translated from the Tamil original) (2015)
  "Restless as Mercury : My Life As A Young Man" (ed. Aleph, 2021)
 "Scorching Love : Letters from M.K.Gandhi to his son Devadas" (ed. with Tridip Suhrud, OUP, 2022)

See also
 List of translators into English

Notes

External links

Gopalkrishna Gandhi Profile of the Governor of Bihar website.

|-

1945 births
21st-century Indian politicians
Ambassadors of India to Iceland
Ambassadors of India to Norway
Indian civil servants
Governors of Bihar
Governors of West Bengal
Gujarati people
High Commissioners of India to South Africa
High Commissioners of India to Sri Lanka
Living people
Gopalkrishna
St. Stephen's College, Delhi alumni
Tamil–English translators
Translators from English
Translators to Hindi
Tirukkural translators
Translators of the Tirukkural into English
People of the Sri Lankan Civil War
Indian Peace Keeping Force
Modern School (New Delhi) alumni